Løvenkrands is a Danish surname. Notable people with the surname include:

 Peter Løvenkrands (born 1980), Danish footballer and manager
 Tommy Løvenkrands (born 1974), Danish footballer

Danish-language surnames